Pride is a 2014 British historical comedy-drama film written by Stephen Beresford and directed by Matthew Warchus. Based on a true story, it depicts a group of lesbian and gay activists who raised money to help families affected by the British miners' strike in 1984, at the outset of what would become the Lesbians and Gays Support the Miners campaign.

It was screened as part of the Directors' Fortnight section of the 2014 Cannes Film Festival, where it won the Queer Palm award. Writer Stephen Beresford said a stage musical adaptation involving director Matthew Warchus was being planned.

The film was nominated for the Golden Globe Award for Best Motion Picture – Musical or Comedy and for the BAFTA for Best British Film, Best Actress in a Supporting Role for Imelda Staunton and for Outstanding Debut by a British Writer, Director or Producer.

Plot
Upon watching the news about the miners' strike, gay activist Mark Ashton realises that the police have stopped harassing the gay community because their attention is elsewhere. He spontaneously arranges a bucket collection for the miners during the Gay Pride Parade in London. Encouraged by the success, he founds "Lesbians and Gays Support the Miners". Among its first members are 20-year-old closeted student Joe Cooper and an older gay couple Gethin and Jonathan, whose bookshop (called Gay's the Word) they use as headquarters.

LGSM faces opposition from the mining community who do not wish to associate with them, as well as within the gay community who feel that the miners have mistreated them in the past. Frustrated by the lack of response, the activists instead decide to take their donations directly to a small mining village named  in Wales. Though he is startled by the revelation of what "L" and "G" stand for in their name, he expresses his gratitude in a short, eloquent speech at a gay bar, and the cause takes off.

In , the Women's Support group, led by Hefina Headon and Maureen Barry, debate whether to invite LGSM to the village as a thank you; Hefina, and her supporters, favour gratitude from all camps, whilst Maureen's supporters consider the gays abhorrent. First-time volunteer Siân James speaks up fiercely in favour of inviting LGSM and is asked to join the committee.

However, the next day Jonathan shares with  his knowledge of harassment laws and abuse of police power; the fiery  marches down to the police station to demand the release of illegally-detained miners.

Many grateful miners acknowledge LGSM's role in their release, relations begin to thaw and the two communities quickly become close. The resulting story humiliates The National Union of Miners, who call a vote on whether to accept LGSM's support.

Back in London, Mark declares that they will embrace the labels in the tabloid and throws an enormous concert at the Electric Ballroom headlined by Bronski Beat, attended by Dai, Hefina and a number of the women from the village. Mark is badly shaken when he encounters a former lover who implies that he is terminal with AIDS.

Disillusioned and haunted, Mark abandons LGSM. Gethin, who initially refused to participate due to his own experience coming out in a mining village, attempts to campaign alone and is violently assaulted and hospitalised.

In March 1985, the Miners' Strike is over. The miners of  gather to go back into the mines. Mark confronts Joe about hiding his activism and homosexuality from his parents. When  drives him to London in the LGSM donated van, he learns of Gethin's condition Joe decides it's time to leave home and has her drive him directly up to his home, embarrassing his conservative mother.

On the day of the 1985 Gay Pride Parade, Mark returns to the group and apologises for abandoning the cause. He leads LGSM to the Parade, where they are joined by hundreds of miners in a show of solidarity.

The closing scenes reveal that consequently the Labour Party incorporated rights for gays and lesbians in their party programme due in part to a massive vote lodged by the National Union of Mineworkers, that  was elected to Parliament, that Jonathan still lived (as of 2014) despite being one of first in Britain to be diagnosed with HIV, and that Mark Ashton died of AIDS just two years later at the age of 26.

Cast

LGSM members
 Ben Schnetzer as Mark Ashton, founder of LGSM
 Joseph Gilgun as Michael (Mike) Jackson, Mark's best friend.
 Faye Marsay as Stephanie (Steph) Chambers, the sole lesbian among the LGSM founders.
 Dominic West as Jonathan Blake, Gethin's partner and the second person diagnosed with HIV in the UK.
 Andrew Scott as Gethin Roberts, Jonathan's partner and a Welshman who was alienated from his village when he came out sixteen years earlier
 Freddie Fox as Jeff Cole, popular with the Onllwyn children.
 Chris Overton as Reggie Blennerhassett, Ray's partner.
 Joshua Hill as Ray Aller, Reggie's partner.
 George MacKay as Joe "Bromley" Cooper, a fictional LGSM member.

Women's Support Group members
 Imelda Staunton as Hefina Headon, member of the strike committee.
 Jessica Gunning as Siân James, wife of Martin.
 Liz White as Margaret Donovan, member of the strike committee and wife of Dai
 Nia Gwynne as Gail Pritchard, wife of Alan.
 Menna Trussler as Gwen, an elderly member, and widow of William, who was a miner.
 Lisa Palfrey as Maureen Barry, a widow and sister-in-law of Cliff who is against LGSM support.

Other characters
 Bill Nighy as Cliff Barry, a leader of the men's union.
 Paddy Considine as David (Dai) Donovan, a leader of the men's union and member of the strike committee
 Rhodri Meilir as Martin James, a leader of the men's union.
 Sophie Evans as Debbie Thomas.
 Karina Fernandez as Stella, an LGSM member who broke off to form an all-female group Lesbians Against Pit Closures.
 Jessie Cave as Zoe, Stella's girlfriend.
 Monica Dolan as Marion Cooper, Bromley's mother.
 Matthew Flynn as Tony Cooper, Bromley's father.
 Olwen Medi as Gethin's mother, who initially disowned him for being gay.
 Kyle Rees as Carl Evans, a miner who asks Jonathan for dancing lessons.
 Jack Baggs as Gary, Carl's friend who also asks for dance lessons.
 Jams Thomas as the Miners Union Leader.
 Deddie Davies as The Old Lady at Bingo.
 Russell Tovey as Tim, apparent ex lover of Mark.

Release

Cinema release
Pride premiered at the 2014 Cannes Film Festival, where it received a standing ovation and won the Queer Palm award. It was also screened at the 2014 Toronto International Film Festival, with the Washington Post reporting that it was "hugely popular with preview and festival audiences". It was released to cinemas throughout the UK on 12 September 2014. It was released in France on 17 September. It was distributed by Pathé in the UK and France, with the title being distributed through Pathé's British distribution partner 20th Century Fox. CBS Films acquired distribution rights for the United States.

The film received a limited release in the US on 26 September 2014, in New York City, Los Angeles and San Francisco.

Controversies
In the UK, the film received a 15 certificate by the British Board of Film Classification for "occasional strong language" and two scenes of a sexual nature, one scene in a gay club where men are depicted "wearing 'bondage' clothing", and a comedic scene where some of the characters discover a pornographic magazine in a bedroom. The MPAA gave the film an R rating, the nearest US equivalent to the UK's 15 certificate. (This reflects common practice; the British Film Institute states that "most" 15 certificate films are R-rated in the US.) The Independent published an article calling the MPAA's rating "draconian", alleging that the R rating's higher age restriction ("no unaccompanied under-17s") was specifically applied due to gay content. The Independents article formed the basis for a Guardian article which further compounded the issue by mistakenly stating that the MPAA had given the film an NC-17 rating. This error was corrected a few days later.

In January 2015, it was reported that the cover of the US DVD release of the film made no mention of the gay content. A standard description of "a London-based group of gay and lesbian activists" was reduced to "a group of London-based activists", and a lesbian and gay banner was removed from a photograph on the back cover.

The absence of any mention of Mark Ashton's communist beliefs in the film, despite his position as the leader of the youth branch of the Communist Party of Great Britain (CPGB), has become a point of contention for his surviving friends. Fellow communist activist and a close friend of Mark Ashton, Lorraine Douglas, accused the film of having "glossed over Mark's politics and said nothing about the fact he subsequently became General Secretary of the YCL", the youth wing of the CPGB.

Reception

Box office
In its opening weekend Pride took £718,778 at the UK box office. It was the third highest-grossing release of the weekend, behind Lucy in second place and The Boxtrolls, which debuted at the top of the box office. During its second weekend in the UK, Pride retained its third-place position with takings of £578,794. The Guardian reported that it had a drop of just 12% during its second weekend, and a strong weekday performance: "After a somewhat shaky start, Matthew Warchus' film is displaying signs of solid traction with audiences." In its third weekend, Pride dropped to sixth with takings of £400,247 over the weekend period. By its fourth weekend it had dropped to tenth place, with takings of £248,654 and an overall UK gross totalling £3,265,317.

In the US, Pride grossed £84,800 from six theatres in its opening weekend. It expanded slowly, adding cinemas in existing markets for its second weekend followed by release in additional cities from 10 October. Audiences surveyed by CinemaScore gave the film an average grade of "A" on an A+ to F scale.

Critical response
Pride was met with critical acclaim. The review aggregator Rotten Tomatoes reported that 92% of critics surveyed gave the film a positive review, based on a sample of 127 reviews, with an average score of 7.6 out of 10; the consensus on the film reads: "Earnest without being didactic and uplifting without stooping to sentimentality, Pride is a joyous crowd-pleaser that genuinely works." Metacritic gave the film an aggregate score of 79/100 based on 36 reviews, indicating "generally favorable reviews."

Geoffrey Macnab, of The Independent, noted how Pride followed on from other British films such as The Full Monty, Brassed Off and Billy Elliot as "a story set in a Britain whose industrial base is being shattered". Macnab, who gave the film a five-star review, praised the screenplay for combining "broad comedy with subtle observation", and noted that director Matthew Warchus "relishes visual contrasts and jarring juxtapositions" throughout the film. Macnab's review stated that Pride retained its humour and accessibility without trivialising the issues addressed in the film.

Peter Bradshaw, reviewing for The Guardian, described the film as "impassioned and lovable". Bradshaw praised performances of the cast, including Bill Nighy's "taciturn shyness" in his portrayal as Cliff and the "dignified and intelligent performance" from Paddy Considine as Dai. Imelda Staunton's performance as Hefina Headon, who died in October 2013, was met with positive reviews by critics. Geoffrey Macnab said Staunton's performance as the matriarchal Hefina was "part Mother Courage and part Hilda Ogden". Ben Schnetzer's performance as Mark Ashton drew positive reviews. Charlotte O'Sullivan, writing for the London Evening Standard, said: "Schnetzer is a New Yorker with an unpromising CV (he was one of the few good things about The Book Thief) and he's fantastic here".

Paul Byrnes in The Sydney Morning Herald described the film as "dry, surprising, compassionate, politically savvy, emotionally rewarding and stacked to the gills with great actors doing solid work".

Nigel Andrews, writing for the Financial Times, gave the film one star out of five, describing it as "a parade of tricks, tropes and tritenesses, designed to keep its balance for two hours atop a political correctness unicycle". Andrews' review read, "Nothing in modern history is more amazing than the cultural rebranding of the UK miners’ strike as a heroic crusade, rather than a Luddite last stand for (inter alia) union demagoguery, greenhouse gas and emphysema."

Awards

Soundtrack

See also
 Brassed Off (1996)
 The Full Monty (1997)
 Billy Elliot (2000)

References

External links
 
 
 
 
 Pride Shooting Script at bbc.com.uk

2014 films
2014 comedy-drama films
2014 LGBT-related films
2010s English-language films
British comedy-drama films
British LGBT-related films
French comedy-drama films
French LGBT-related films
Films set in 1984
Films set in 1985
Films about anti-LGBT sentiment
LGBT-related comedy-drama films
LGBT-related political films
LGBT working-class culture
LGBT-related controversies in film
Rating controversies in film
Mining in Wales
UK miners' strike (1984–1985)
BBC Film films
LGBT-related films based on actual events
Gay-related films
Queer Palm winners
Films about activists
Films about the labor movement
Films about mining
Films set in mining communities
CBS Films films
Films set in Wales
Films set in London
Young Communist League (Great Britain)
English-language Welsh films
English-language French films
2010s British films
2010s French films